Alfredo Adame (born Alfredo Adame Von Knoop on 10 June 1958) is a Mexican actor, producer and host.

Filmography

Films

Television

As producer

References

External links 

Alfredo adame la controversia | La Verdad Noticias

1958 births
Living people
Mexican male telenovela actors
Mexican male television actors
Mexican male film actors
Mexican television producers
Mexican television presenters
Male actors from Guadalajara, Jalisco
20th-century Mexican male actors
21st-century Mexican male actors
People from Guadalajara, Jalisco
Mexican people of German descent